Are You Gonna Go My Way is the third studio album by American singer Lenny Kravitz, released on March 9, 1993, by Virgin Records. It was recorded at Waterfront Studios, Hoboken, New Jersey, by Henry Hirsch. It became Kravitz's first top 20 album on the United States Billboard 200, and his first number one album in both Australia and the United Kingdom, achieving worldwide success that helped to establish his popularity as a performer.

Album information
The album had a good reception by fans and music critics and it is still considered one of Kravitz's best works.

Musically, it contained songs inspired by classic rock artists such as Jimi Hendrix, John Lennon, Curtis Mayfield, Sly and Robbie, and Prince.

Additional guitars were contributed by Craig Ross.

Singles
"Are You Gonna Go My Way" was released as the lead single. The song peaked at number one on the Australian Singles Chart, and also peaked at number one on the US Mainstream Rock chart, becoming his first number one single in both countries, while it peaked at number 2 on the Hot Modern Rock Tracks. It was only released for airplay in the US and therefore did not chart on the Hot 100, but was a worldwide hit, peaking at number 4 in both the United Kingdom and France. The song is not only considered to be one of Kravitz's greatest hits as an artist, but also as one of the biggest anthems of the 1990s. Appears in the video games Gran Turismo 3: A-Spec (in a GT Remix) and Guitar Hero World Tour as well as Guitar Hero Live.

"Believe" was the second single from the album. It is a rock ballad that speaks of faith and freedom. The song was another major success from the album, peaking at number 60 on the Billboard Hot 100, number 15 on the US Mainstream Rock chart, number 10 on the Hot Modern Rock Tracks, number 30 on the UK, and number 8 in Australia.

"Heaven Help", the third single from the album, is an R&B and soul song. It originally entered at number 92 on the Billboard Hot 100 but later peaked at number 80, being charted as a double A-side single along with "Spinning Around Over You". The double A-side format also peaked at number 92 on the Hot R&B/Hip-Hop Songs, while in the United Kingdom, it became Kravitz's second top 20 single from the album, reaching number 20.

"Is There Any Love in Your Heart" was released as the final single from the album. It peaked at number 19 on the Hot Mainstream Rock Tracks chart, number 52 in the UK, and number 32 in Australia.

"Spinning Around Over You" charted as a double A-side single along with "Heaven Help", peaking at number 80 on the Billboard Hot 100 and number 37 on the Hot Mainstream Rock tracks chart. The single was originally featured on the soundtrack to the film Reality Bites and was featured on the album as a bonus track, thus being the final single from the album.

Chart performance
Are You Gonna Go My Way has been very successful not only in the United States, but also worldwide, particularly in the major markets of Europe and South America. It reached number 12 on the Billboard 200 and number one on the UK Albums Chart and the Australian Albums Chart. As of March 2008, the album has sold 2.2 million units in the US.

The title track has been considered one of Kravitz's signature songs and was nominated for two Grammy Awards. It was also voted in at number 28 in Triple J's Hottest 100 of 1993, an Australian music poll run by the radio station Triple J.

Track listing

Original edition
 "Are You Gonna Go My Way" (Lenny Kravitz, Craig Ross) – 3:31
 "Believe" (Kravitz, Henry Hirsch) – 4:50
 "Come on and Love Me" (Kravitz) – 3:52
 "Heaven Help" (Gerry DeVeaux, Terry Britten) – 3:10
 "Just Be a Woman" (Kravitz) – 3:50
 "Is There Any Love in Your Heart" (Kravitz, Ross) – 3:39
 "Black Girl" (Kravitz) – 3:42
 "My Love" (Kravitz, Ross) – 3:50
 "Sugar" (Kravitz) – 4:00
 "Sister" (Kravitz) – 7:02
 "Eleutheria" (Kravitz) – 4:48

Vinyl edition bonus CD track listing
 "Ascension" (Kravitz, Hirsch) – 3:45
 "Brother" (Kravitz) – 4:16
 "Good Lovin'" (DeVeaux, Britten) – 3:34
 "Someone Like You" (Kravitz, Ross, Hirsch) – 4:14
 "All My Life" (Kravitz) – 6:24
 "Spinning Around Over U" (Kravitz, Ross) – 3:35
 "For the First Time" (Kravitz) – 3:38
 "Lonely Rainbows" (Kravitz, Hirsch) – 2:26

20th Anniversary Edition Bonus Tracks

Disc One
Bonus Tracks (The B-Sides)
 "Spinning Around Over You" (Kravitz, Ross) – 3:35
 "Ascension" (Kravitz, Hirsch) – 3:44
 "All My Life" (Kravitz) – 6:25
 "Brother" (Kravitz) – 4:18
 "Someone Like You" (Kravitz, Ross, Hirsch) – 4:15
 "For the First Time" (Kravitz) – 3:41
 "B-Side Blues" (Kravitz) – 3:32

Disc Two
The Acoustic Versions
 "Believe (Acoustic Version)" (Kravitz, Hirsch) – 4:07
 "Sister (Acoustic Version)" (Kravitz) – 6:07
 "Heaven Help (Acoustic Version)" (DeVeaux, Britten) – 3:58
Work In Progress: Demos & Outtakes
 "Work Like the Devil" (Kravitz) – 4:46
 "Feeling Alright (Instrumental)" (Kravitz) – 3:49
 "Getting Out (Will You Marry Me)" (Kravitz, Ross) – 4:16
 "Good Lovin'" (Kravitz) – 3:34
 "Blood/Papa (A Long And Sad Goodbye) (Instrumental)" (Ross, Hirsch) – 10:59
 "Early Morning Blues (Instrumental)" (Kravitz) – 4:33
The Vanessa Paradis Demos
 "I May Not Be A Star (Light Piece For Vanessa)" (Kravitz) – 4:43
 "Travelogue (Your Love Has Got A Handle On My Mind)" – 4:21
 "Lonely Rainbows" (Kravitz, Hirsch) – 2:26
Bonus Interview
 "BBC Interview with Mick Wilkojc" – 15:28

Personnel
Credits adapted from the album's liner notes.

Musicians
 Lenny Kravitz – lead and background vocals, electric guitar , electric guitar solo , acoustic guitar , bass , drums , Mellotron , chimes and orchestral arrangement , string arrangement , horn arrangement 
 Craig Ross – electric guitar , acoustic guitar 
 Henry Hirsch – bass , piano and ARP string ensemble , Wurlitzer organ and orchestral arrangement 
 Tony Breit – bass 
 Dave Domanich – drums and electric guitar 
 Michael Hunter – French horn , flugelhorn 
 Michael "Ibo" Cooper – Hammond B-3 organ and clavinet 
 Eric Delente – violin 
 Soye Kim – violin 
 Robert Lawrence – violin 
 Sarah Adams – viola 
 Liuh-Wen Ting – viola 
 Allen Whear – cello 
 Frank Murphy – cello 
 Carolyn Davies Fryer – double bass 
 Gerry DeVeaux – background vocals 
 Angie Stone – background vocals 

Production
 Produced by Lenny Kravitz
 Engineered and mixed by Henry Hirsch
 Assistant engineer – Greg Di Gesu
 Mastered by Greg Calbi at Sterling Sound Studios
 Art direction by Len Peltier
 Design by Jean Krikorian and Len Peltier
 Cover photography by Jean-Baptiste Mondino

Charts

Weekly charts

Year-end charts

Certifications and sales

References

Sources
Are You Gonna Go My Way on cduniverse.com

1993 albums
Lenny Kravitz albums
Virgin Records albums
Albums produced by Lenny Kravitz